Mortola is a monotypic genus of ammotrechid camel spiders, first described by Cândido Firmino de Mello-Leitão in 1938. Its single species, Mortola mortola is distributed in Argentina.

References 

Solifugae
Animals described in 1938
Arthropods of Argentina